Lane is a surname with several origins.

Meanings and origins
From Middle English a topographic name for someone who lived on a lane, used to denote any narrow pathway, including one between houses in a town.  A Norman or Breton origin has also been proposed for some people bearing this surname, derived from L'Asne, itself perhaps coming from a nickname such as le Asinus (the Ass) or from a toponym in Normandy or Brittany.

A prominent Lane family documented in Staffordshire claim to have Norman ancestry, and list the earliest ancestor as "Adam de Lone" living in 1315.  Lane families enjoyed prominence in other counties such as Kent, Gloucestershire, Buckinghamshire, and Northamptonshire where Sir Ralph Lane is theorized to have originated.  A knighted Sir Richard Lane is found in Northamptonshire in the early 1600s.

Tax lists of Buckinghamshire in 1400s list "John atte Lane" and "William atte Lane" with the Saxon term "atte" being the same as the French term "de la", showing topographic reference.

Lane families took part in the Plantations of Ireland as it is theorized Sir George Lane was part of the same family as Sir Ralph Lane.

In 1663, a Matthys Laenen Van Pelt emigrated from Amsterdam to New Jersey.  The family appears to have shortened the name to Lane after arriving.

Early Virginia County Tax lists of the late 1700s show Lane families with the spellings of "Lane", "Lain", and "Layne" but with no indication of importance for the different spellings, other than possible separation of unrelated Lane families.  By the middle 1800s though, "Lane" was commonly adopted.

Lane is also an Anglicized form, of three Irish Gaelic surnames, however, no evidence showing the following words being used as "Lane" can be found.
Ó Laighin ‘descendant of Laighean’, a byname meaning ‘spear’, or ‘javelin'.
Ó Luain ‘descendant of Luan’, a byname meaning ‘warrior’.
Ó Liatháin.

A
Abbe Lane (born 1932), American actress
Abigail Lane (born 1967), English artist
Alexander Lane (1857–1911), American physician and politician
Allen Lane (1902–1970), publisher
Alycia Lane (born 1972), American television journalist
Andrew Lane (disambiguation), several people
Andy Lane (born 1963), author and journalist
Anita Lane (1959–2021), Australian singer and songwriter
Anthony Lane (born 1962), British film reviewer and journalist
Arthur Bliss Lane (1894–1956), U.S. diplomat

B
Bill Lane (1922–2000), Australian amateur ornithologist
Bill Lane (publisher) (1919–2010), American magazine publisher, diplomat, and philanthropist
Billy Lane (born 1970), U.S. motorcycle builder
Bobby Lane (born 1939), American football player
Brendan Lane (disambiguation)
Brian Lane (RAF officer) (1917–1942), Second World War Royal Air Force fighter pilot and ace
Burton Lane (1912–1997), U.S. composer and lyricist

C
Carla Lane (1937–2016), pseudonym of Romana Barrack, a British television writer
Charles Lane (disambiguation)
Colin Lane (born 1965), Australian comedian

D
David Lane (disambiguation), several people
Denny Lane (1818–1895), Irish businessman and nationalist public figure
Devinn Lane (born 1972), pornographic actress
Diane Lane (born 1965), U.S. actress
Dick Lane (1936–2002), scholar, author, collector, and dealer of Japanese art
Dick Lane (American football) (1928–2002), American football player
Dick Lane (baseball) (born 1927), U.S. baseball player
Dick Lane (TV announcer) (1899–1982), television announcer
Don Lane (1933–2009), talk show host

E
Eastwood Lane (1879–1951), U.S. composer
Ebenezer D. Lane (1814–1879), American ship captain
Edgar Lane (1923-1964), American professor of political science
Edward William Lane (1801–1876), British scholar
Elizabeth Lane (1905–1988), British lawyer
Ernest Preston Lane (1886–1969), American mathematician

F
Fitz Hugh Lane (1804–1865), U.S. painter
Frank Lane (1896–1981), U.S. baseball executive
Franklin Knight Lane (1864–1921), Canadian-American politician
Fred Lane (American football) (1975–2000), American football player
Frederic C. Lane (1900–1984), U.S. historian
Frederick Lane (1888–1969), Australian swimmer

G

 Gary Lane (chess player) (born 1964),  professional chess player and author
 Gary Lane (gridiron football) (born 1942),  American football quarterback and American football official
 Gary Lane (politician) (born 1942), Canadian politician and Saskatchewan MLA
 Geoffrey Lane, Baron Lane (1918–2005), British Judge 
 George Martin Lane (1823–1897), U.S. scholar
 Gord Lane (born 1953), Canadian ice hockey player

H
Harlan Lane (1936–2019), American professor of psychology and linguistics, Northeastern University, Boston
Harriet Lane (1830–1903), United States President James Buchanan's niece
Harry Lane (1855–1917), American politician
Hester Lane (1???–1849), American abolitionist
Homer Lane (1875–1925), American educator 
Hugh Lane (1875–1915), Irish (Irish-British) Art Collector and Philanthropist

J
J. Michael Lane (1936–2020), American epidemiologist
Jackie Lane (actress) (1941–2021), British actress
James D. Lane (born 1965), American electric blues guitarist
James Henry Lane (Union general) (1814–1866), U.S. abolitionist, Senator, and general
James Henry Lane (Confederate general) (1833–1907), Confederate general
Jane Lane (author) (1905–1978), British historical novelist
Jani Lane (born 1964), U.S. singer (Warrant)
Jason Lane (born 1976), American professional baseball player
Jay Lane (born 1964), American drummer 
Jeffrey Lane, film producer and actor
Jim Lane (Irish republican) (born 1938), Irish republican and socialist
Jocelyn Lane (born 1937), model, actress and jewellery designer
John Lane (publisher) (1854–1925), British publisher
John Carey Lane (1872–1958), Mayor of Honolulu
Jonathan Homer Lane (1819–1880), American astrophysicist and inventor
Joseph Lane (1801–1881), U.S. general
Joseph Lane (1851–1920), English socialist
Julia Lane, New Zealand, British, and American economist and economic statistician

K
Kenneth Jay Lane (1932–2017), American costume jewelry designer
Kris Lane (born 1967), professor of Latin American history

L
Lafayette Lane (1842–1896), U.S. politician
Lana Lane, American rock singer
Larry Lane, an alias of Finnish soldier Lauri Törni (1919–1965)
Lauren Lane (born 1961), U.S. actress
Lenny Lane (born 1970), U.S. professional wrestler, real name Leonard Carlson
Leota Lane (1913–1963), U.S. actress, one of the Lane Sisters
Lisa Lane (born 1938), U.S. chess player
Lola Lane (1906–1981), U.S. actress, one of the Lane Sisters
Lunsford Lane (1803–1879), ex-slave
Lupino Lane (1892–1959), English actor 
Lyle Franklin Lane (1926–2013), U.S. Diplomat

M
Margaret Lane (1907–1994), British journalist, biographer and novelist
Mark Lane (author) (1927–2016), author of Rush to Judgment
Martin Lane (born 1961), English footballer
Matteo Lane (born 1982), U.S. comedian
Mills Lane (1937–2022), U.S. judge and boxing referee
Morgan D. Lane (1844–1892), American Civil War Medal of Honor recipient

N
Nathan Lane (born 1956), American actor

P
Patrick Lane (1939–2019), Canadian poet
Philip Lane (disambiguation)
Priscilla Lane (1915–1995), U.S. actress one of the Lane Sisters

R
Ralph Lane (c. 1530 – 1603), English explorer
Red Lane (1939–2015), stage name of Hollis Rudolph DeLaughter, American singer-songwriter
Richard Lane (disambiguation)
Robert Lane (disambiguation)
Ronnie Lane (1946–1997), British singer and songwriter
Rose Wilder Lane (1886–1968), American writer
Rosemary Lane (1914–1974), one of the American Lane Sisters
Roy Lane (c. 1935 – 2009), British racing driver
Ryan Lane (born 1987), American actor and model

S
Sam Lane (rugby player) (born 1991), rugby union footballer
Samantha Lane (born 1979), Australian AFL writer 
Sara Malakul Lane (born 1983), Thai actress and model
Sarah Lane (born 1984), American ballet dancer
Selwyn George (Bill) Lane (1922–2000), Australian ornithologist
Shawn Lane (1963–2003), U.S. musician (Black Oak Arkansas)
Stan Lane (born 1953), U.S. professional wrestler
Stanley Lane-Poole (1854–1931), British orientalist

T
Tami Lane (born 1974), American makeup artist 
Terry Lane, Australian radio broadcaster and newspaper columnist
Thomas Lane (disambiguation)
Tim Lane (disambiguation)
Trevor Lane, American professional baseball player

W
Walter P. Lane (1817–1892), Confederate general
William Lane (disambiguation)

Y

Fictional characters
Solomon Lane, in the film Mission: Impossible – Rogue Nation
Drury Lane (character), a detective created by Ellery Queen
Gerry, Karin, Constance & Rachel Lane, in the 2013 film World War Z
Jane Lane (Daria), in the animated series Daria
Lois Lane, DC Comics character
Lucy Lane, DC Comics character Lois' sister
Sam Lane (comics), DC Comics character Lois and Lucy's father
Brian Lane (New Tricks), in the drama series New Tricks
Margo Lane, in The Shadow radio drama and pulp novels
 Lane Alexander, a recurring character from the Nickelodeon TV show Victorious

See also
Lane, division of the carriageway within a road designated to be used by a single line of vehicles
Laine, surname list
Layne, name list
Lyne (surname)
Lynes (disambiguation)
Lehane, surname list

References

Surnames of Irish origin
English-language surnames